Burleigh Head is a small national park at Burleigh Heads in the City of Gold Coast in  South East Queensland, Australia.

Geography 
The park is tiny yet it contains a diverse range of habitats. Tallebudgera Creek enters the ocean directly south of the park. No camping is permitted in the park. Access is via the Gold Coast Highway which passes by the park. An information centre is available.

Burleigh Head National Park is a popular place for hiking, walkers and joggers because it located in a cool climate and provides great views. There are two walking tracks in the national park, one climbing the hill to the summit which is about 88 m above sea level, called the Rainforest circuit and another leading around the headland just above sea level called the Ocean view circuit. Watching migrating whales from within the park is another popular activity.

Landform

The headland has steep sides and is 80 m in height.  The formation of the Burleigh headland began between 23 and 25 million years ago. At this time the Tweed Volcano was active. Molten basalt lava from the volcano flowed all the way down the valleys and eroded them all. The valleys were covered in hardened sedimentary rocks before reaching what is now the Burleigh headland. Along Tallebudgera Creek there are rocky platforms and sandy beaches.  On the seaside part of the park are black boulders at the base of a cliff. Upstream tidal Tallebudgera Creek has a mangrove environment.

The headland is an important cultural site for the local Aboriginal tribe known as the Minjungbal people.

Flora
The park preserves remnant areas of rainforest and mangrove forests. Western parts are dominated by dry eucalypt forest containing species such as brush box, forest red gum and grey ironbark. On the seaward facing slopes are Swamp she-oak, native hibiscus tree and Pandanus palms. There are also areas of heathland and tussock grassland.

Fauna
The Australian brush-turkey, brahminy kites, sea eagles and koalas can be found in the park. There are also lace monitors, echidnas, mountain brushtail possums, common brushtail possums and common ringtail possums. Rainbow lorikeets are commonly seen feeding on blossoms in the park.

Walking track
The park contains a popular walking track, known as the Oceanview Track, which connects Burleigh Heads and Tallebudgera Creek.  In December 2014, the track was closed due to boulders smashing into the path as they cascaded down the slopes.  The track was re-opened in mid-2015 after further at-risk boulders and rock fragments were removed.

See also

 Protected areas of Queensland

References

National parks of South East Queensland
Protected areas established in 1994
Burleigh Heads, Queensland
1994 establishments in Australia